Youness El Mouaffaq (1994), better known by his stage name Cri6, is a London-based Moroccan competitive b-boy. As of July 2017, he has won a silver medal in the Hip-hop dance category at the VIII Jeux de la Francophonie in Abidjan, Ivory Coast, competing together with the Moroccan national team 04 Lkarwa.

Career 
Youness El Mouaffaq was born in Fez, Morocco. He performed in some of the international dance competitions included Red Bull BC One World Final, World BBoy Series, The Notorious IBE, BBIC Korea, B.I.S China.

Youness El Mouaffaq, competing as Bboy Cri6, has been rising as a top competitor on the scene for the past few years. He's a member of El Mouwahidine and Lhiba Kingzoo with fellow Moroccan B-Boys,  and The Wolfer.

At the 2017 Jeux de la Francophonie in Abidjan, Ivory Coast, the Canal aux Bois stage hosted the final phase of Hip-hop dance competition. Youness El Mouaffaq won the silver medal in the Hip-hop dance category, competing together with the Moroccan national team 04 Lkarwa  and succeeded in hoisting the flag of Morocco in the skies of Abidjan and thus offering the country a silver medal at the VIII Jeux de la Francophonie.

Youness El Mouaffaq ranked 18th place globally at WDSF World Breaking Championship that took a place in Nanjing, China on June 23, 2019.

He also participated in numerous international events such as:

 30.11.2019 Hustle & Freeze Vol.14 China
 23.06.2019 WDSF World Breaking Championship China
 15.03.2019 Circle Industry Austria
 13.10.2018 DPC Jam Switzerland
 27.09.2018 Red Bull BC One World Final Switzerland
 21.04.2018 JBL Unbreakable World Final Belgium
 17.12.2016 Risk Battle 2017 Austria
 22.10.2016 D.Point.C Jam Switzerland.

Awards 

 1st Place The Notorious IBE 3 vs 3, Netherlands – 2019 
 1st Circle Industry Finals, Austria – 2019
 1st Place Best Moroccan B-boy – 2019
 1st Place Battle of East, Estonia – 2018
 2nd Place DPC JAM, Switzerland – 2018
 2nd Place Les Jeux de la Francophonie, Ivory Coast – 2017
 1st Place Show and Prove, UK – 2016
 2nd Place Pasha 2312 All styles, Austria – 2016
 1st Place Red Bull BC One, Morocco Cypher – 2015

References 

Dancesport
1994 births
Breakdancers
Living people
People from Fez, Morocco
Moroccan dancers